Alessio Tombesi (born 25 April 1982) is an Italian footballer who plays as a defender or midfielder.

Career
Tombesi started his career at Viterbese of Serie B. He then played for Frosinone of Serie D and won promotion in summer 2001.

He was signed by A.C. Perugia, at that time in Serie A. After a season in their youth team, he was loaned to Sambenedettese of Serie C1. In summer 2003, Tombesi transferred to Paternò of Serie C1 as the club bought half of the player contractual rights.

In summer 2004, Chievo signed Tombesi, but again, he was farmed to Vittoria (Serie C1) in co-ownership deal, then Carpenedolo (Serie C2) in co-ownership deal until released in summer 2007.

But on 2 July 2007, he was offered a contract from Parma F.C. of Serie A, where he made his Serie A debut on 26 August 2007 against Catania. But he just played once more before left on loan to Serie B club Avellino.

At the end of season, he joined Novara in co-ownership deal.

In summer 2010 he joined Atletico Roma in co-ownership deal from Parma, along with Gianluca Lapadula (loan), Abel Gigli (co-ownership) and Abdou Doumbia (loan) for undisclosed fee, as part of the deal that Lega Pro Seconda Divisione top-scorer Daniel Ciofani moved to opposite direction in another co-ownership deal for undisclosed fee.

After the bankrupt of Atletico Roma, he joined Triestina on free transfer.

References

External links
Profile at Footballplus (2005-06) 
 Gazzetta.it
http://aic.football.it/scheda/8123/tombesi-alessio.htm

Italian footballers
Frosinone Calcio players
A.C. Perugia Calcio players
A.C. Carpenedolo players
Parma Calcio 1913 players
U.S. Avellino 1912 players
Novara F.C. players
Atletico Roma F.C. players
U.S. Triestina Calcio 1918 players
A.S.D. Paternò 1908 players
F.C. Vittoria players
Serie A players
Association football defenders
Footballers from Rome
1982 births
Living people